Serdar is the Turkic spelling of the Persian masculine given name Sardar (Persian: سردر sardar or سردار sardār) which generally means "commander (of an army)" but could also bear the meaning "field marshal". Notable people with the name include:

 Adil Serdar Saçan, Turkish police chief
 Serdar Apaydın, Turkish basketball player
 Serdar Avcı, Turkish boxer
 Serdar Aziz, Turkish footballer
 Serdar Azmoun, Iranian footballer
 Serdar Bayrak, Turkish footballer
 Serdar Berdimuhamedow, Turkmen politician, president of the Republic (2022-)
 Serdar Demirel (born 1983), Turkish sport shooter
 Serdar Dursun, Turkish footballer
Serdar Gökhan (born 1943), Turkish actor
 Serdar Gözübüyük, Dutch football referee of Turkish descent
 Serdar Güneş, Turkish footballer
 Serdar Kurtuluş, Turkish footballer
 Serdar Nasır, Turkish plastic surgeon
Serdar Ortaç (born 1970), Turkish singer, songwriter and composer
 Serdar Özbayraktar, Turkish footballer
 Serdar Özkan, Turkish footballer
 Serdar Tasci, German footballer of Turkish descent
 Serdar Topraktepe, Turkish footballer

Turkish masculine given names